Catocala martyrum is a moth in the family Erebidae first described by Charles Oberthür in 1881. It is found in China.

References

martyrum
Moths described in 1881
Moths of Asia
Taxa named by Charles Oberthür